Skutari may refer to:

 Shkodër, known as Scutari and Skutari in Italian and traditional English usage
 Skoutari (disambiguation)
 Scutari (disambiguation)